Sylt is an island in northern Germany, part of Nordfriesland district, Schleswig-Holstein, and well known for the distinctive shape of its shoreline. It belongs to the North Frisian Islands and is the largest island in North Frisia.
The northernmost island of Germany, it is known for its tourist resorts, notably Westerland, Kampen and Wenningstedt-Braderup, as well as for its  sandy beach. It is frequently covered by the media in connection with its exposed situation in the North Sea and its ongoing loss of land during storm tides. Since 1927, Sylt has been connected to the mainland by the Hindenburgdamm causeway. In later years, it has been a resort for the German jet set and tourists in search of occasional celebrity sightings.

Geography 

With , Sylt is the fourth-largest German island and the largest German island in the North Sea. Southeast of Sylt are the islands of Föhr and Amrum, to the north lies the Danish island of Rømø. Its greatest width, from the town of Westerland in the west to the eastern Nössespitze near Morsum, measures . On the western and northwestern shore, there is a  sandy beach. To the east of Sylt, is the Wadden Sea, which belongs to the Schleswig-Holstein Wadden Sea National Park and mostly falls dry during low tide.

The island's shape has constantly shifted over time, a process which is still ongoing today. The northern and southern spits of Sylt are exclusively made up of infertile sand deposits, while the central part with the municipalities of Westerland, Wenningstedt-Braderup and Sylt-Ost consists of a geestland core, which becomes apparent in the form of the Red Cliff of Wenningstedt. The geestland facing the Wadden Sea gradually turns into fertile marshland around Sylt-Ost. Sylt has only been an island since the Grote Mandrenke flood of 1362.

The island in its current form has only existed for about 400 years. Like the mainland geestland, it was formed of moraines from the older ice ages, thus being made up of a till core, which is now apparent in the island's west and centre by the cliff, dunes and beach. This sandy core began to erode as it was exposed to a strong current along the island's steep basement when the sea level rose 8000 years ago. During the process, sediments were accumulated north and south of the island. After the ice ages, marshland began to form around this geestland core.

In 1141, Sylt is recorded as an island, yet before the Grote Mandrenke flood it belonged to a landscape cut by tidal creeks and, at least during low tide, it could be reached on foot. It is only since this flood that the creation of a spit from sediments began to form the current characteristic shape of Sylt. It is the northern and southern edges of Sylt which were, and still are, the subject of greatest change. For example, Listland was separated from the rest of the island in the 14th century and from the later 17th century onwards the Königshafen (King's Harbour) began to silt up as the "elbow" spit began to form.

In addition to the constant loss of land, the inhabitants during the Little Ice Age were constrained by sand drift. Dunes shifting to the east threatened settlements and arable land and had to be stopped by the planting of marram grass in the 18th century. Consequently, though, material breaking off the island was increasingly washed away and the island's extent continued to decrease.

Records of the annual land loss exist since 1870.

Severe storm surges of the last decades have repeatedly endangered Sylt to the point of breaking in two, e.g. Hörnum was temporarily cut off from the island in 1962. Part of the island near Rantum which is only 500 m wide is especially threatened.

Measures of protection against the continuous erosion date back to the early 19th century when groynes of wooden poles were constructed. Those were built at right angles into the sea from the coast line. Later they were replaced by metal and eventually by armoured concrete groynes. The constructions did not have the desired effect of stopping the erosion caused by crossways currents. "Leeward erosion", i.e. erosion on the downwind side of the groynes prevented sustainable accumulation of sand.

In the 1960s breaking the power of the sea was attempted by installing tetrapods along the groyne bases or by putting them into the sea like groynes. The four-armed structures, built in France and many tons in weight, were too heavy for Sylt's beaches and were equally unable to prevent erosion. Therefore, they were removed from the Hörnum west beach in 2005.

Since the early 1970s the only effective means so far has been flushing sand onto the shore. Dredging vessels are used to pump a mixture of sand and water to a beach where it is spread by bulldozers. Thus storm floods would only erase the artificial accumulation of sand, while the shoreline proper remains intact and erosion is slowed down. This procedure incurs considerable costs. The required budget of an annual €10 million is currently provided by federal German, Schleswig-Holstein state and EU funds. Since 1972 an estimated 35.5 million cubic metres of sand have been flushed ashore and dumped on Sylt. The measures have so far cost more than €134 million in total, but according to scientific calculations they are sufficient to prevent further loss of land for at least three decades, so the benefits for the island's economic power and for the economically underdeveloped region in general would outweigh the costs. In the 1995 study Klimafolgen für Mensch und Küste am Beispiel der Nordseeinsel Sylt (Climate impact for Man and Shores as seen on the North Sea island Sylt) it reads: "Hätte Sylt nicht das Image einer attraktiven Ferieninsel, gäbe es den Küstenschutz in der bestehenden Form gewiss nicht" (If Sylt did not have the image of an attractive holiday island, coastal management in its current form would certainly not exist).

The enforcement of a natural reef off Sylt is being discussed as an alternative solution. A first experiment was conducted from 1996 to 2003. A sand drainage as being successfully used on Danish islands is not likely to work on Sylt owing to the underwater slope here.

In parallel to the ongoing sand flushing, the deliberate demolition of groynes has begun amid great effort at certain beach sections where they were proven largely ineffective. This measure also terminated the presumably most famous groyne of Sylt, Buhne 16 – the namesake of the local naturist beach.

A number of experts, however, fears that Sylt will still have to face considerable losses of land until the mid 21st century. The continuous global warming is thought to result in increasing storm activity, which would result in increased land loss and, as a first impact, might mean the end of property insurance. Measurements showed that, unlike in former times, the wave energy of the sea is no longer lost offshore, today it carries its destructive effects on to the beaches proper. This will result in an annual loss of sand of 1.1 million m³.
The dunes of the island constitute nature reserves and may only be traversed on marked tracks. So called "wild paths" promote erosion and are not to be followed. Where vegetation is tread upon, no roots are left to hold the sand and it will be removed by wind and water.

The Wadden Sea on the east side between Sylt and the mainland has been a nature reserve and bird sanctuary since 1935 and is part of the Schleswig-Holstein Wadden Sea National Park. The construction of breakwaters in this area will abate sedimentation and is used for land reclamation.

Also the grazing of sheep on the sea dikes and heaths of Sylt eventually serves coastal management, since the animals keep the vegetation short and compress the soil with their hooves. Thus they help create a denser dike surface, which in case of storm surges provides less area for the waves to impact.

Flora and fauna 

The flora of Sylt is shaped by the island's original sparseness. Until the mid 19th century Sylt was an island almost completely devoid of trees, only artificial plantations created small areas of forest and bush. Still today one can recognize the man-made structure of the Friedrichshain and Südwäldchen forests in Westerland, the trees mostly standing in rank and file. Also the now widespread rose Rosa rugosa, known as the "Sylt rose" on the island was only imported to Sylt. It originates from the Kamchatka peninsula in Siberia. The undemanding rose met ideal conditions on Sylt and spread so quickly that it is now a common sight on the island. Its proliferation is viewed critically from a biological point of view, since it threatens to displace endangered local species, especially on the heaths.

The ample heaths on the eastern side of the island provide habitats for many rare species of plants and animals which are adapted to the extreme conditions such as drought, warmth, wind. About 2,500 animal species and 150 species of plants have so far been recorded. 45% of those plants are on the IUCN Red List. Especially notable are the 600 species of butterflies that live in the heaths, small tortoiseshell, brimstone, painted lady and peacock butterfly among them.

With several thousand individuals in the dune belt of Sylt, the natterjack toad, endangered in Germany, has one of Germany's largest populations here. Their spawning places are wet dune slacks and shallow, short-lived pools. For a habitat they prefer sandy areas with vegetation, but the species has also been observed on the top of the Uwe Dune. The main threat for this species on Sylt is road traffic.

The many water birds and other coastal avians that have their hatching grounds on Sylt or use the island for resting on their migrations constitute an ornithological feature. There are two notable hatching areas on Sylt, the Königshafen bay with the small island Uthörn in the north and the Rantum basin in the southeast. Birds that hatch on Sylt include black-headed gull, Arctic tern, pied avocet, common redshank, common gull, oystercatcher, northern lapwing, common shelduck and tufted duck. During the migration, Sylt is a resting spot for thousands of brent geese and shelducks, Eurasian wigeons and common eiders, as well as bar-tailed godwits, red knots, dunlins and Eurasian golden plovers. Ringed plover, common snipe, ruff and other species are less common visitors to the island.

Regarding land mammals, there is no significant difference from the neighbouring areas of mainland Nordfriesland. Primarily European hare, rabbit and roe deer can be found and are also hunted as game on the island. When the island was connected to the mainland by the causeway, red fox and European badger also became common.

West of Sylt a breeding area of harbour porpoises is located. In addition, great numbers of harbour seals and grey seals, the latter being rather uncommon in German seas, can be found on sand banks off Sylt.

Numerous associations and societies that care for the exploration and the protection of endangered animals and plants have branches on Sylt. Among them are the Alfred-Wegener-Institute for Polar and Marine Research, Verein Jordsand and Wadden Sea Conservation Station. Also the Federal Office for the Environment operates a research station in the dunes at Westerland.

Climate 
On Sylt, a marine climate influenced by the Gulf stream is predominant. With an average of 2 °C, winter months are slightly milder than on the mainland, summer months though, with a median of 17 °C, are somewhat cooler, despite a longer sunshine period. The annual average sunshine period on Sylt is 4.4 hours per day. It is due to the low relief of the shoreline that Sylt had a total of 1,899 hours of sunshine in 2005, 180 hours above the German average. Clouds cannot accumulate as quickly and are generally scattered by the constant westerly or northwesterly winds.

The annual mean temperature is 8.5 °C. The annually averaged wind speed measures 6.7 m/s, predominantly from western directions. The annual rainfall amounts to about 650 millimetres. Since 1937 weather data are collected at Deutscher Wetterdienst's northernmost station on a dune near List, which has meanwhile become automated. A number of commercial meteorological services like Meteomedia AG operate stations in List too.

Sylt features an oceanic climate that is influenced by the Gulf Stream. On average, the winter season is slightly warmer than in mainland Nordfriesland. The summer season, however, is cooler despite longer sunshine periods. The yearly average sunshine period is greater than 4.4 hours per day with some years exceeding the average sunshine for all of Germany. Also precipitation is lower than on the mainland. This is due to the low relief of Sylt's shoreline where clouds are not able to accumulate and rain off.

Settlements

Sylt is divided into two administrative bodies: the Amt Landschaft Sylt administrates all municipalities on the island, save for the Gemeinde Sylt, which was established in 2009 from the formerly independent municipalities of Westerland, Rantum and Sylt-Ost. As of December 2007, Sylt had 21,190 inhabitants, 9,072 of whom living in Westerland. These numbers do not include owners of summer residences.

A referendum held in May 2008 resulted in a merger of the Sylt-Ost municipality with the town of Westerland on 1 January 2009. Various interest groups hope to merge every island municipality into one governing body.

Settlements along the west coast 
Six municipalities are situated along the west coast of Sylt. List in the very north of the island constitutes Germany's northernmost municipality; it retained a certain independence due to its remote location and its long-time adherence to the kingdom of Denmark. On its eastern shore, a harbour is located where, in addition to tourist ships, the "Sylt-Express" ferry-boat sails to Havneby on the Danish island of Rømø. Wenningstedt together with Braderup and Kampen used to form the Norddörfer (Northern Villages) municipality, an early intercommunal association, which partly remains today in form of a school union. While Kampen, mainly in the 1950s and 1960s, was famous in Germany for attracting celebrities, Wenningstedt has been known as a "family resort" for more than 100 years. Since 1855, the prominent black and white Kampen Lighthouse has been located between Kampen and Wenningstedt; it is the oldest one on the island. East of there, the Braderuper Heide nature reserve is situated. Right south of Wenningstedt are the town limits of the island's largest town, Westerland.

After the complete destruction of the village Eidum by a storm surge on 1 November 1436, the survivors founded a new village northeast of their old home: Westerland. The name was first recorded in 1462. In 1865 a seaside spa was founded, 50 years later Westerland was granted town privileges. In 1949 it was officially recognised as a health resort. In 2007, the town numbered 9,072 citizens.

South of Westerland, the island extends for about 15 km in the form of a spit, until it is cut by the Hörnumtief tidal creek that runs through the Wadden Sea mudflats east of Sylt. Here is the location of Rantum. This village, like no other on Sylt, had to fight sand drift during the past centuries. Many farmsteads and a church had to be abandoned because of shifting dunes moving eastward. Only the planting of marram grass stopped the dunes and put an end to this threat. To the east there are a few scattered spots of marshland, while the area is mostly dominated by dunes.

Hörnum on the island's southern headland is the youngest village, having been founded shortly after 1900. But already in former times the uninhabited southern tip of Sylt was said to serve as refuge for pirates and fishermen. The name Budersand in the area emanates from that custom, marking a great dune where booths stood in former times to serve as shelters. This southern headland, called Odde, is marked by continuous loss of land. Each year great amounts of sand are washed away by storm floods and coastal management has not yet seen sustainable effects in the area, so that further losses have to be expected.

Sylt-Ost

Sylt-Ost (East Sylt) is a former municipality which was formed in 1970 out of several small villages on the Nössehalbinsel of Sylt. The population (as of 2000) was 5,500. The villages included Tinnum, Munkmarsch, Archsum, Morsum and Keitum. In 2009, Sylt-Ost merged with Westerland and Rantum to form Gemeinde Sylt.

History
Geographically, Sylt was originally part of Jutland (today Schleswig-Holstein and mainland Denmark), with evidence of human habitation going back to 3000 BC at Denghoog. The first settlements of Frisians appeared during the 8th century and 9th century. In 1386, Sylt was divided between the Duke of Schleswig and the King of Denmark; except for the village of List, Sylt became part of the Duchy of Schleswig in 1435.

During the 17th and 18th century, whaling, fishing and oyster breeding increased the wealth of the population. At this time, Keitum became the capital of the island, and a place for rich captains to settle down. In the 19th century, tourism began. Westerland replaced Keitum as the capital. During World War I, Sylt became a military outpost. On 25 March 1916 British seaplanes bombed the German airship sheds on Sylt. The main connection for tourists was boats from Højer. Since Højer was ceded to Denmark in 1920, a rail causeway to the mainland was built in 1927, the Hindenburgdamm, named after Paul von Hindenburg. During World War II, Sylt became a fortress, with concrete bunkers built below the dunes at the shore, some of which are still visible today. Lager Sylt, the concentration camp on Alderney was named after the island. Rudolf Höss hid on the island after Nazi Germany's defeat, but he was later captured and brought to trial in Poland.

Today, Sylt is mainly a tourist destination, famous for its sandy beaches and healthy climate. The PWA World Tour Windsurf World Cup Sylt, established in 1984, is annually held at Westerland's beach front. Sylt is also popular for second home owners, and many German celebrities who own vacation homes on "the island".

The Freikörperkultur and nude bathing

At the beginning of the 20th century, the bathing beaches on Sylt were segregated by sex into "ladies' bath" (Damenbad) and "men's bath" (Herrenbad); one bathed in long bathing dresses of that time period. From the beginning of the 20th century - starting from the Free German Youth camp Klappholttal and the intellectuals and artists in the village of Kampen - a social movement developed that lived a beach life without clothing (part of the German Freikörperkultur - FKK and Lebensreform movement). The first official nude bathing beach in Germany was opened on Sylt in 1920. Nude bathing and sunbathing (also erroneously referred to as "nudist" or "nudism") spread over the entire island. "Sylt" was associated with nude bathing and the ideal environment for supporters of the Freikörperkultur (FKK). Since the 1960s there have been designated nudist beaches (marked FKK-Strand) with names such as "Abyssinia", "Samoa" or "Zanzibar" on the entire west beach. The most famous nudist beach on Sylt became the "Groyne 16" (Buhne 16) in Kampen through regular reports in the tabloid media. Today the boundaries between nude and textile beaches are becoming more and more blurred. While nude beaches have lost some of their popularity, it is no longer unusual or sensational to bathe or sunbathe on "normal" beaches with no clothes on.

Culture 
Sylt is a part of the Frisian Islands. It has its own local dialect, Söl'ring, which is the indigenous speech of Sylt. Söl'ring is a dialect of insular North Frisian, with elements of Danish, Dutch and English. Today, only a small fraction of the population still speak Söl'ring. A law to promote the language (Friesisch-Gesetz) was passed in 2004. The northernmost part of the island, Listland, was traditionally Danish-speaking.

As in many areas in Schleswig-Holstein on New Year's Eve, groups of children go masked from house to house, reciting poems. This is known as "Rummelpottlaufen", and as a reward, children receive sweets or money.

Sylt also features many Frisian-style houses with thatched roofs.

Since the mid-18th century, the vowel in the name of the island has been represented as "y" for unknown reasons, while older spellings are Sildt and Silt, allegedly derived from Danish sild "herring", or maybe related to English silt.

Sylt is mentioned in a pangram, a sentence that uses each letter in the German alphabet, including every umlaut (ä, ö, ü) plus the ß: Victor jagt zwölf Boxkämpfer quer über den großen Sylter Deich ("Victor chases twelve boxers across the Great Levee of Sylt").

Sylt in painting 
Among the first painters who discovered Sylt as a theme were Eugen Dücker and Eugen Bracht. Franz Korwan followed them.
The painter Andreas Dirks was born in Tinnum on Sylt in 1865. He studied at the Düsseldorf Art Academy and in Weimar, lived in Düsseldorf since 1895, accepted a professorship there in 1916 and at the same time maintained a studio in Westerland.
Ulrich Schulte-Wülwer described him as "... the strongest artistic talent that the island has produced". Carl Arp came to Sylt in 1903.
Painters like Emil Nolde, Erich Heckel, Anita Rée and Albert Aereboe moved to Sylt. Contemporary artists include the painters and sculptors Rainer Fetting and Ingo Kühl, who live in Berlin and on Sylt.

Notable people

 Dirk Meinerts Hahn (born 1804 in Westerland, Sylt – 1860) best known as the captain of the ship Zebra that he captained to South Australia
 Cornelius Jensen (1814 in Sylt – 1886) a Danish sea captain for 20 years; arriving in San Francisco in 1848, he became a rancher, a vintner and served as a California politician.
 Henriette Hirschfeld-Tiburtius (1834 in Sylt – 1911) the first female dentist in Germany
 Gustav Jenner (1865 in Keitum – 1920) a German composer, conductor and musical scholar and the only formal composition pupil of Johannes Brahms
 Hermann von der Lieth-Thomsen (1867–1942 in Sylt) a German military aviation pioneer, lived in Sylt from 1928
 Margarete Boie (1880 – 1946) a German author in the 1920s incorporating the history, landscape and people of Sylt
 Anita Rée (1885 – 1933) a German-Jewish painter, lived and worked here
Heinz Reinefarth (1903 – 1979) a German SS commander during World War II and government official in West Germany after the war. During the Warsaw Uprising of August 1944 his troops committed numerous atrocities. After the war Reinefarth became the mayor of Westerland and member of the Schleswig-Holstein Landtag
 Boy Lornsen (1922 in Keitum – 1995) a German sculptor and author of children's literature
 Dora Heldt (born Bärbel Schmidt, 1961 in Sylt) a German author

Transport

Sylt is connected to the German mainland by the Hindenburgdamm, a causeway with a railway line on top. The passenger trains connect Westerland (Sylt) to Niebüll or Klanxbüll, and the Deutsche Bahn's "Syltshuttle" as well as RDC's "Autozug Sylt", allow the transfer of cars and trucks between Westerland and Niebüll. There are also car ferry services to the nearby Danish island of Rømø, which offers a road connection to the mainland. Sylt Airport at Westerland serves the region.

In other media
The island was used during the filming of The Ghost Writer, as an alternate location for Martha's Vineyard, due to the film's director, Roman Polanski being unable to travel to the United States, due to an outstanding arrest warrant for rape. The ferry between the islands of Sylt and Rømø features prominently in the film.

See also

Üüs Söl’ring Lön’, insular anthem
Heinz Reinefarth, a Nazi-German military officer. The "Butcher of Warsaw" became mayor of Westerland after World War II.
Uthlande

References

External links

Sylt IPTV
Sylt

 
Seaside resorts in Germany
Geography of Schleswig-Holstein
Islands of Schleswig-Holstein